William Reid Clark was a Canadian Anglican bishop in the first decades of the 20th century.

He was educated at Trinity College, Toronto and ordained in 1876. He was curate of St Luke's  Burlington and then held incumbencies in Barton Township, Ontario and Ancaster, Ontario before becoming the Archdeacon of Niagara in 1902 and its fourth diocesan bishop in 1911. He died in post in April 1925.

References 

Year of birth unknown
Trinity College (Canada) alumni
Anglican archdeacons in North America
Anglican bishops of Niagara
20th-century Anglican Church of Canada bishops
1925 deaths